The well-field system was a Chinese land redistribution method existing between the ninth century BCE (late Western Zhou dynasty) to around the Warring States period. Though Mencius describes examples from the Xia and Shang dynasties these could be mythological or imagined though. The name comes from Chinese character 井 (jǐng), which means 'well' and looks like the # symbol; this character represents the theoretical appearance of land division: a square area of land was divided into nine identically sized sections; the eight outer sections (私田; sītián) were privately cultivated by farmers or nong in Chinese one of the occupations of the four occupations system and the center section (公田; gōngtián) was communally cultivated on behalf of the government or in some case's the landowning aristocrat or Duke.

While all fields were  government or aristocrat-owned, the private fields were managed exclusively by farmers and the produce was entirely the farmers'. It was only produce from the communal fields, worked on by all eight families, that went to the government for famine distribution or the aristocrats and which, in turn, could go to the king as tribute.

Though in Mencius it is said that all people in office got 50 mu about half an arce.

As part of a larger fengjian system, the well-field system became strained in the Spring and Autumn period as kinship ties between aristocrats became meaningless.  When the system became economically untenable in the Warring States period, it was replaced by a system of private land ownership.  It was first suspended in the state of Qin by Shang Yang and other states soon followed suit though king hui of Wei and king xuan of Qi did think about restoring it after Mencius talked to them but they didn't 

As part of the "turning the clock back" reformations by Wang Mang during the short-lived Xin dynasty, the system was restored temporarily  and renamed to the King's Fields (王田; wángtián).  The practice was more-or-less ended by the Song dynasty, but scholars like Zhang Zai and Su Xun were enthusiastic about its restoration invoking Mencius's frequent praise of the system.

It is mentioned in the book of rites and it is said most anciently that the farmers only had to work the government fields 3 days a year though if this is true is unknown it is also said that the most ancient had house's given away and 3 days was all that was required and that  the market the goods would not be taxed only a small fee for a stall and travelers weren't taxed  later it is said in other  texts that taxes were put on the market goods when a merchant was looking from side to side and people thought he was plotting.

See also 

 Agriculture in China
 Economic history of China
 Ejido
 Equal-field system
 Sharecropper
 Tenancy

References

Bibliography

External links 
Encyclopædia Britannica

Agriculture in China
Chinese inventions
Economic history of China
History of agriculture
Ancient Chinese institutions